Walter John "Wally" Sieb (May 6, 1899 – January 18, 1974) was an American football halfback for the Racine Legion of the National Football League (NFL) in 1922. He played at the collegiate level at Ripon College.

Biography
Sieb was born on May 6, 1899 in Butternut, Wisconsin. He died on January 18, 1974.

References

1899 births
1974 deaths
Racine Legion players
Ripon Red Hawks football players
People from Ashland County, Wisconsin
Players of American football from Wisconsin